G Ettinger Limited is a British company, based in London, specialising in luxury leather goods.  Founded in 1934 by Gerry Ettinger, the eponymous company is still 100% family-owned and run.

The company designs and is an artisanal manufacturer of small luxury leather goods, cases and bags, which are sold on their website and distributed internationally, especially in Japan.

The company has its own leather goods factory in Walsall, but has kept its head office in London.

G Ettinger Ltd was awarded a royal warrant to Charles, Prince of Wales in 1996 and has also made gifts under licence for the Wimbledon Championships from 1992 until 2015.

Company history
Ettinger began as a British importer of leather goods and luxury gifts from continental Europe.  England then still had an important leather industry, and it was in London that the finest leather goods were made.

From the 1950s to the '80s, Ettinger gradually strengthened its manufacturing base in London and then in Walsall, still under the helm of "Gerry" Ettinger.

Robert Ettinger, Gerry's eldest son, took over in 1990.  The company specialised further into small upmarket leather goods and developed the Ettinger brand, notably in Japan.

Craftsmanship
As one of the last leather goods manufacturers in Great Britain, the company is taking an active role in promoting craftsmanship and craft tutoring in the UK.

Partnerships and associations
Throughout the years, Ettinger has made all kinds of leather goods for many British brands, including Asprey, Harrods, Fortnum & Mason, and Bentley.

The company is a member of the following business organisations:
Royal Warrant Holders Association
The Walpole, the British luxury brands association
BTAA, British Travelgoods and Accessories Association

See also 
Walsall Leather Museum
Whitehouse Cox (British company)

References

External links

Galen Leather

1934 establishments in England
British Royal Warrant holders
Clothing brands of the United Kingdom
Companies based in the London Borough of Wandsworth
Clothing companies established in 1934
Gloves
Leather manufacturers
Luxury brands
Manufacturing companies of the United Kingdom
Clothing retailers of England
Clothing companies based in London